Scott Russell (born 7 May 1970) is a former Australian rules footballer who played for Collingwood and Sydney in the Australian Football League. He played all possible 26 games in his debut season in 1990, winning a premiership medallion at the end of the year.

External links

Australian rules footballers from South Australia
1970 births
Living people
Collingwood Football Club players
Collingwood Football Club Premiership players
Sydney Swans players
Sturt Football Club players
South Australian State of Origin players
One-time VFL/AFL Premiership players